Athanas is a genus of shrimp of the family Alpheidae. These are small shrimp measuring 2 cm in length. Females have smaller chelae than males.

Some species, including A. djiboutensis, are called "bulldozer shrimp" because of the way that they push sand and small stones about.

Species
This is a list of species in the genus Athanas:

Athanas amazone Holthuis, 1951
Athanas anatidactylus Anker & Marin, 2007
Athanas areteformis Coutière, 1903
Athanas dentirostris Anker, Jeng & Chan, 2001
Athanas dimorphus Ortmann, 1894
Athanas djiboutensis Coutière, 1897
Athanas gracilipes Banner & Banner, 1978
Athanas gracilis Boone, 1935
Athanas granti Coutière, 1908
Athanas grimaldii Coutière, 1911
Athanas hasswelli Coutière, 1908
Athanas hongkongensis Bruce, 1990
Athanas iranicus Anker, Naderloo & Marin, 2010
Athanas ivoiriensis Anker & Ahyong, 2007
Athanas japonicus Kubo, 1936
Athanas jedanensis De Man, 1910
Athanas locincertus Banner & Banner, 1973
Athanas marshallensis Chace, 1955
Athanas minikoensis Coutière, 1903
Athanas naga Banner & Banner, 1966
Athanas nitescens (Leach, 1814)
Athanas nouvelae Holthuis, 1951
Athanas ohsimai Yokoya, 1936
Athanas orientalis Pearson, 1905
Athanas ornithorhynchus Banner & Banner, 1973
Athanas parvus De Man, 1910
Athanas phyllocheles Banner & Banner, 1983
Athanas polymorphus Kemp, 1915
Athanas rhothionastes Banner & Banner, 1960
Athanas squillophilus Hayashi, 2002
Athanas stebbingii De Man, 1920
Athanas sydneyensis Anker & Ahyong, 2007
Athanas tenuipes De Man, 1910

References

Alpheidae
Decapod genera
Taxa named by William Elford Leach